Ostankinsky District, also called simply Ostankino,  is an administrative district (raion) of North-Eastern Administrative Okrug, and one of the 125 raions of Moscow, Russia. VDNH exhibition center and Ostankino Tower, the tallest structure in Europe, are located in Ostankinsky. The district is served by Moscow Monorail.

History and etymology

Ostankinsky district is named after Ostankino village, which existed on the site before urbanization. Its name literally means 'remains'; however, despite popular misconception, it was not built on a graveyard. 16th-century sources refer to the village as Ostashkovo, from the Christian name Eustachy.

As a populated place Ostankino has been known at least since the Russian Time of Troubles, but it is better associated with the Sheremetiev estate in the form of a park and palace complex. During the dissolution of the Soviet Union it gained even more fame with its television tower and television centre.

Gallery

See also
Administrative divisions of Moscow

References

Notes

Sources

Districts of Moscow
North-Eastern Administrative Okrug